Jharlangi was a practice of obligatory labour provided by the peasants in feudal Sikkim to the officials, state visitors. Jharlangi was a forced labour imposed by the Kazis and Thikadars of Sikkim to the Sikkimese peasantry.

References

History of taxation in India
Legal codes
South Asia
Sikkim
Sikkim monarchy
Monarchs of Sikkim